Robert Glenn Johnson Jr.  (June 28, 1931 – December 20, 2019), better known as Junior Johnson, was an American NASCAR driver of the 1950s and 1960s. He won 50 NASCAR races in his career before retiring in 1966. In the 1970s and 1980s, he became a NASCAR racing team owner, winning the NASCAR championship with Cale Yarborough and Darrell Waltrip. He produced a line of fried pork skins and country ham. He is credited as the first to use the drafting technique in stock car racing. He was nicknamed "The Last American Hero," and his autobiography is of the same name. In May 2007, Johnson teamed with Piedmont Distillers of Madison, North Carolina, to introduce the company's second moonshine product, called "Midnight Moon Moonshine".

Early life and race career
Johnson was born in Ronda, North Carolina, the fourth of seven children of Lora Belle (Money) and Robert Glenn Johnson, Sr. His family is of Ulster Scots descent, and settled in the foothills of North Carolina in the eighteenth century. The Johnson family was involved in the whiskey business before he was born. His maternal great-grandfather served as the second-highest-ranking Confederate general in North Carolina.

His father, a lifelong bootlegger, spent nearly twenty of his sixty-three years in prison, as their house was frequently raided by revenue agents. Junior was arrested and spent one year in prison in Ohio in 1956-57 for having an illegal still, although he was never caught in his many years of transporting bootleg liquor at high speed.

In 1955, Johnson began his career as a NASCAR driver. In his first full season, he won five races and finished sixth in the 1955 NASCAR Grand National points standings.

In 1958 Johnson won six races.

In 1959, Johnson won five more NASCAR Grand National races (including a win from the pole position at the 1959 Hickory 250); by this time he was regarded as one of the best short-track racers in the sport.

His first win at a "superspeedway" came at the Daytona 500 in 1960. Johnson and his crew chief, Ray Fox, were practicing for the race, trying to figure out how to increase their speed, which was  slower than that of the top cars in the race. During a test run, a faster car passed Johnson. He noticed that, when he moved behind that car, his own car's speed increased because of the faster car's slipstream. Johnson was then able to stay close behind the other car until the final lap of the test run, when he used the "slipstream" effect to slingshot past it. By using this technique, Johnson went on to win the 1960 Daytona 500, despite that his car was slower than others in the field. Johnson's technique was quickly adopted by other drivers, and his practice of "drafting" has become a common tactic in NASCAR races.

In 1963 he had a two-lap lead in the World 600 at Charlotte before a spectator threw a bottle onto the track and caused a crash; Johnson suffered only minor injuries. Johnson also tried to qualify for the 1963 Indianapolis 500 but he failed to qualify.

He retired as a driver in 1966. In his career, Johnson claimed 50 victories, 11 at major speedway races. He retired as the winningest driver never to have a championship.

Johnson was a master of dirt track racing. "The two best drivers I've ever competed against on dirt are Junior Johnson and Dick Hutcherson," said two-time NASCAR champion Ned Jarrett.

Career as a NASCAR owner

As a team owner, he worked with many NASCAR drivers, including Darel Dieringer, LeeRoy Yarbrough, Cale Yarborough, Bobby Allison, Darrell Waltrip, Neil Bonnett, Terry Labonte, Geoffrey Bodine, Sterling Marlin, Jimmy Spencer and Bill Elliott. In all, his drivers won 132 races, which is fifth to Petty Enterprises, Hendrick Motorsports, Joe Gibbs Racing and Roush Fenway Racing. His drivers won six Winston Cup Championships—three with Yarborough (1976–1978) and Waltrip (1981–82, 1985).

In 2011, Johnson announced that he would restart a race team with son Robert as the driver. Junior Johnson Racing will be located in Hamptonville, North Carolina. Robert, the 2010 UARA Rookie of the Year, planned to run a 28–30 race schedule in 2011, which includes the entire K&N East Series schedule and some races in the UARA and Whelen All-American Series.

Awards
He was named one of NASCAR's 50 Greatest Drivers in 1998.
He was inducted in the Motorsports Hall of Fame of America in 1991.
Johnson joined Michael Jordan, Dale Earnhardt Jr. and Richard Petty by having a stretch of highway named in his honor in 2004. His daughter Meredith sang the national anthem at the dedication of the highway. An  stretch of U.S. Highway 421 from the Yadkin and Wilkes county line to the Windy Gap exit is named Junior Johnson Highway.
He was inducted into the NASCAR Hall of Fame on May 23, 2010.

Family
Johnson was briefly married in 1949 to Mary Gray. His marriage to childhood sweetheart Flossie Clark (1929–2020) ended in divorce in 1992; they were legally married in 1975, although they had been together since the early 1950s. (Racing Legends have them as married in 1958). His marriage to Lisa Day (b.1965) in 1992 resulted in two children: daughter Meredith Suzanne (b.1995) and son Robert Glenn Johnson III (b.1993), both of whom attended Duke University. Johnson built a new home for his family in 1997, selling in 2012 because of poor health. He resided in Charlotte, North Carolina, at the time of his death in 2019.
Until Flossie's death on April 9, 2020, she still resided in the family home, built by Junior in 1964 (next to Johnson's old Ingle Hollow race shop), which she kept as part of the divorce settlement.

Presidential pardon
On December 26, 1986, President Ronald Reagan granted Johnson a presidential pardon for his 1956 moonshining conviction. In response to the pardon, which restored his right to vote, Johnson said, "I could not have imagined anything better."

Film
In the mid-1960s, writer Tom Wolfe researched and wrote an article about Johnson, published in March 1965 in Esquire, and reprinted in Wolfe's The Kandy-Kolored Tangerine Flake Streamline Baby. This was eventually reprinted in The Best American Sports Writing of the Century, ed. David Halberstam (1999). The article, originally entitled "Great Balls of Fire", turned Johnson into a national celebrity and led to fame beyond the circle of NASCAR fans. In turn, the article was made into a 1973 movie based on Johnson's career as a driver and moonshiner, The Last American Hero (a.k.a. Hard Driver). Jeff Bridges starred as a fictionalized Johnson, and Johnson himself served as technical advisor for the film.  The movie was critically acclaimed and featured the Jim Croce hit song "I Got A Name".

Follow Your Dreams Productions' President and CEO, Fred Griffith, has signed a rights deal for a true-life story movie about Junior Johnson (Sports Illustrated Vault, 2006). Griffith, an American actor and producer from South Carolina, is currently adapting a screenplay based largely on the book, Junior Johnson, Brave In Life, written by Tom Higgins and Steve Waid (Big West Racing, 2006). Veteran actor and producer Chris Mulkey is a writing producer for the film. According to Griffith, this film—unlike The Last American Hero, which was about a fictionalized version of Johnson named Junior "Jackson"—will remain true to the real life of Junior Johnson.(Morris 2006, p. C-1) Johnson had a voice role in the animated film Cars 3, as Junior "Midnight" Moon, a reference to his Moonshine Company.

Midnight Moon
In May 2007, Johnson teamed with Piedmont Distillers to introduce the company's second moonshine product, called Midnight Moon.  Johnson became part owner of Piedmont Distillers, the only legal distiller in North Carolina at the time. Piedmont Distillers is located in Madison, N.C., in the town’s former train station built in 1915. Midnight Moon follows the Johnson family’s generations-old tradition of making moonshine and is available in all 50 states. Every batch is produced in an authentic copper still and handcrafted in small batches.  The 'shine is a legal version of his locally famous family recipe and is available in eight varieties that range from 70–100 proof.

Death
Johnson died at a hospice care facility in Charlotte on December 20, 2019, at age 88. He had Alzheimer's disease at the time.

Motorsports career results

NASCAR
(key) (Bold – Pole position awarded by qualifying time. Italics – Pole position earned by points standings or practice time. * – Most laps led.)

Grand National Series

Daytona 500

See also
List of people pardoned or granted clemency by the president of the United States

References

External links
Official website for Junior Johnson
Oral History Interview with Junior Johnson at Oral Histories of the American South

CanadianDriver.com Article on Junior Johnson
Junior Johnson Biography

International Motorsports Hall of Fame inductees
NASCAR drivers
People from Rockingham County, North Carolina
People from Wilkesboro, North Carolina
Racing drivers from North Carolina
Recipients of American presidential pardons
1931 births
2019 deaths
NASCAR team owners
American people of Scotch-Irish descent
NASCAR Hall of Fame inductees